Brzeziny  is a village in the administrative district of Gmina Skomlin, within Wieluń County, Łódź Voivodeship, in central Poland.

References

Brzeziny